The N-Gage QD is a handheld game console and smartphone by Nokia, and a redesign of the N-Gage. It was unveiled on April 14, 2004, and was released on May 26, 2004, running the same Symbian OS v6.1 with Series 60 1st Edition FP1.

It revised the original N-Gage's physical design, being smaller and rounder. It corrected the flaw of the original's cartridge slot placement with a more convenient one on the bottom of the device as opposed to behind the battery. This design also moved the earpiece to the face of the device, rather than on the side, as in the previous model.

The device retailed at a lower price compared to the original N-Gage device, aided by the fact that it was usually sold with service contracts and applicable subsidies. For instance, in the United States the N-Gage QD was available as a prepaid phone offered by Cingular at retail games stores such as Electronics Boutique and GameStop.

Changes

Some features available in the original system, such as MP3 playback, FM radio reception and USB connectivity, were removed from the new device, presumably to reduce size and cost. Instead of using the N-Gage with generic USB removable drive drivers, a user could use either Bluetooth or a separate MMC card reader to transfer files onto the device memory or an MMC card for use in the N-Gage QD. The QD did not support MP3 internally; however, it could still play MP3s with third-party software, albeit only in 16 kHz mono.

Another change from the original unit was the "Orange-and-grey" theme of the face of the unit as well as the GUI. Some felt this was an unwanted change from the "more colorful" GUI of the original N-Gage. Even then there were some third-party applications that enhanced the interface or replaced the system shell.

As a telephony device, the newer N-Gage no longer supported three GSM frequency bands 900/1800/1900; instead it came in two dual-band variants, one for the American market and another for the European and Asian markets.

The only change made to the device's buttons was the replacement of the original five-way controller (four ordinal directions and a center "click" or confirm) with a simpler four-way directional controller and a separate "OK" button with a check logo.

The QD was running the same software version as its predecessor, despite the newer Symbian 7.0s Series 60 2nd Edition having been shipped on several smartphones by the time the QD was announced.

N-Gage QD Silver Edition
Announced in August 2005, the N-Gage QD Silver Edition could be seen as an exercise in extending the life of the N-Gage product range while new N-Gage devices were developed and the N-Gage gaming range was integrated into the mainstream Series 60 product range. Apart from cosmetic changes and the replacement of the two specialist gaming buttons (5 and 7) with standard keys, there was no difference in the N-Gage QD Silver Edition to the regular N-Gage QD.

It was made available in the European, Middle Eastern, and African markets on September 1, 2005.

See also
N-Gage (device)
Nokia

References

Products introduced in 2004
ARM-based video game consoles
Handheld game consoles
Nokia mobile phones
Sixth-generation video game consoles
Smartphones
Symbian devices